Mayor of York may refer to:

Lord Mayor of York, England
Mayor of York, Ontario, Canada
Mayor of York, Pennsylvania, United States